So You Think You Can Dance: The Next Generation may refer to:

 So You Think You Can Dance: The Next Generation (Dutch TV series)
 So You Think You Can Dance: The Next Generation (Polish TV series)
 So You Think You Can Dance: The Next Generation (U.S. TV series)